Sugar Grove is a borough in Warren County, Pennsylvania, United States. The population was 614 at the 2010 census.

Geography
Sugar Grove is located at  (41.982166, -79.341588).

According to the United States Census Bureau, the borough has a total area of 1.1 square miles (2.9 km2), all  land.

Demographics

As of the census of 2000, there were 613 people, 232 households, and 180 families residing in the borough. The population density was 550.2 people per square mile (213.2/km2). There were 250 housing units at an average density of 224.4 per square mile (87.0/km2). The racial makeup of the borough was 99.51% White, 0.16% African American, and 0.33% from two or more races. Hispanic or Latino of any race were 0.16% of the population.

There were 232 households, out of which 36.6% had children under the age of 18 living with them, 61.6% were married couples living together, 11.2% had a female householder with no husband present, and 22.4% were non-families. 19.8% of all households were made up of individuals, and 13.4% had someone living alone who was 65 years of age or older. The average household size was 2.64 and the average family size was 3.00.

In the borough the population was spread out, with 27.9% under the age of 18, 7.8% from 18 to 24, 27.2% from 25 to 44, 21.2% from 45 to 64, and 15.8% who were 65 years of age or older. The median age was 37 years. For every 100 females there were 88.0 males. For every 100 females age 18 and over, there were 81.1 males.

The median income for a household in the borough was $36,125, and the median income for a family was $41,964. Males had a median income of $29,519 versus $21,607 for females. The per capita income for the borough was $16,896. About 6.7% of families and 8.2% of the population were below the poverty line, including 11.1% of those under age 18 and 4.0% of those age 65 or over.

Trivia
 Rob Buck of the band 10,000 Maniacs is buried in Mission Cemetery in Sugar Grove.
 Gene Johnson, mandolinist and tenor vocalist of the country band Diamond Rio, grew up in Sugar Grove.
 There was a convention in Sugar Grove during the time that slaves came to the North and Canada by the Underground Railroad. It was re-held every year in the middle of June.
 There were fugitives that Joah Carter hid during the Underground Railroad times from the Corry, Pennsylvania area.
Location of Camp Stone, a summer camp run by the Bnei Akiva organization.

References

Boroughs in Warren County, Pennsylvania
Populated places established in 1893
1893 establishments in Pennsylvania